Price optimization is the use of mathematical analysis by a company to determine how customers will respond to different prices for its products and services through different channels. It is also used to determine the prices that the company determines will best meet its objectives such as maximizing operating profit. The data used in price optimization can include survey data, operating costs, inventories, and historic prices & sales. Price optimization practice has been implemented in industries including retail, banking, airlines, casinos, hotels, car rental, cruise lines and insurance industries.

Overview
Price optimization utilizes data analysis to predict the behavior of potential buyers to different prices of a product or service. Depending on the type of methodology being implemented, the analysis may leverage survey data (e.g. such as in a conjoint pricing analysis) or raw data (e.g. such as in a behavioral analysis leveraging 'big data' ). Companies use price optimization models to determine pricing structures for initial pricing, promotional pricing and discount pricing.

Market simulators are often used to simulate the choices people make to predict how demand varies at different price points. This data can be combined with cost and inventory levels to develop a profitable price point for that product or service. This model is also used to evaluate pricing for different customer segments by simulating how targeted customers will respond to price changes with data-driven scenarios.

Price optimization starts with a segmentation of customers. A seller then estimates how customers in different segments will respond to different prices offered through different channels. Given this information, determining the prices that best meet corporate goals can be formulated and solved as a constrained optimization process. The form of the optimization is determined by the underlying structure of the pricing problem.

If capacity is constrained and perishable and customer willingness-to-pay increases over time, then the underlying problem is classified as a yield management or revenue management problem. If capacity is constrained and perishable and customer willingness-to-pay decreases over time, then the underlying problem is one of markdown management. If capacity is not constrained and prices cannot be tailored to the characteristics of a particular customer, then the problem is one of list-pricing. If prices can be tailored to the characteristics of an arriving customer then the underlying problem is sometimes called customized pricing.

References

Fundamental analysis
Pricing